The Man They Could Not Hang is a 1934 Australian film directed by Raymond Longford about the life of John Babbacombe Lee, whose story had been filmed previously in 1912 and 1921.

Synopsis
In Devonshire, John Lee works for wealthy spinster Emma Keys. On the night he is engaged to be married, Keys is murdered and Lee is arrested on circumstantial evidence and is convicted of murder. He is condemned to death but when the authorities try to execute him the trap doors will not open. They fail a second time and his sentence is commuted to life imprisonment. There is a sub-plot about smuggling and secret service agents.

Cast
Ronald Roberts as John Babbacombe Lee
Arthur W. Sterry as John Lee Snr
Ethel Bashford as Mrs Lee
Olive Sinclair as Miss Keyse
Patricia Minchin as Eliza Parrish
Ethel Gabriel as Jane Allen
Claire Barnes as Kate Farmer
Sam Stern as Bertrand
Les Warton as Ted Meeks
George Doran as Captain Giles
Leo Starke as Captain Hill
Nugent Harrington as Tim Sanders
Bobbie Beaumont as Polly Sanders
W. Newton Carroll as Ned Sawkins

Production
The production company responsible for the film, Invicta, was formed by J.A. Lipman, in 1933 with capital of £5,000. Lipman hired Raymond Longford and produced the film under the name of 'Rigby C. Tearle'. The story had been filmed twice before to great box office success. Eric Bedford wrote the scenario.

Lipman leased the No. 2 studios of Cinesound Productions at Rushcutters Bay, which had just been used for When the Kellys Rode. Shooting started on 12 March 1934 with Cinesound crew.

The cast included Arthur W. Sterry, who exhibited the 1912 film version of the story and directed the 1921 version.

Release

Censorship
A few days prior to the film's premiere, the New South Wales police requested a number of cuts be made to the film regarding its depiction of the police. This was done, even though the film was set in England.

Longford was unable to attend the premiere due to illness. In Sydney is screened on a double bill with Cinesound Varieties.

Critical
The film was given a poor critical reception, the Sydney Morning Herald calling it:
Purely antiquarian. The very language of the characters is far-off and unreal... could have been directed in a more convincing way.. The one bright spot in the whole melancholy chronicle is the acting of Mr. Ron Roberts... Given better material, this young man could do some excellent work.
The critic from The Argus said that the film was:
Closer to the far-fetched melodrama of The Streets of London than to the realism of the better films of to-day. The story... doubtless contains good dramatic material, but Invicta Films, an Australian company, have so disguised it that it appears sillier than the creations of the hack scenario writer's fancy. The complicated story has been unwound in a rambling, disjointed fashion, and the dialogue is so childishly stiff and melodramatic that even the most docile audience is fidgeting and giggling before the end. The cast is full of those stage types that went out with the appearance of Pinero – the red-eyed village maiden, who murmurs "Justice will prevail", the moustached French villain, who cannot speak without leering, smirking and kissing his finger- tips, and the stalwart British policeman, who arrests the wrong man with the noble words, "Duty is duty." The spirit of the piece seems to have possessed the cast completely, but perhaps the stiffness of the acting is due to their ignorance of the difference between stage and screen technique.
The Courier Mail did say "the prison scenes are realistically done, and at times the tension is strong."

The film obtained a small release in England where it also received bad reviews.

Box office
The movie performed solidly in country areas. However, by the end of 1934 a trade paper reported it as having earned only £2,200 at the Australian box office with the possibility of this going up to £3,000 ("although it's doubtful") and the sale to England giving it a chance to recoup the budget. It is unclear whether this happened.

Longford never made another feature as director.

References

External links

The Man They Could Not Hang at National Film and Sound Archive
The Man They Could Not Hang at AustLit
The Man They Could Not Hang at Oz Movies

1934 films
Australian drama films
Australian black-and-white films
Films directed by Raymond Longford
1934 drama films
John Babbacombe Lee
Films set in Devon
1930s English-language films